Aishalton Airport  is an airport serving the village of Aishalton, in the Upper Takutu-Upper Essequibo Region of Guyana.

See also

 List of airports in Guyana
 Transport in Guyana

References

External links
Aishalton Airport
OpenStreetMap - Aishalton
OurAirports - Aishalton
HERE/Nokia - Aishalton

Airports in Guyana